"Jag tror på människan" is a rock ballad written by Johan Stentorp, Lasse Andersson and Tommy Nilsson, and performed by Tommy Nilsson at Melodifestivalen 2007. The song participated in the semifinal inside the Kinnarps Arena in the town of Jönköping, Sweden on 3 February 2007, directly reaching the finals inside the Stockholm Globe Arena on 10 March 2007, where it ended up in 10th place, without earning any points. Tommy Nilsson referred to this as to do a "shutout" in the Stockholm Globe Arena. The previous time he performed at Melodifestivalen was also inside the Stockholm Globe Arena, when his song "En dag" won the contest in 1989.

The song charted at Svensktoppen for one week, entering the chart on 25 March 2007. It ended up 9th, before getting knocked out of chart the upcoming week.

The song's lyrics describe what mankind can do together for humanity and planet Earth, in a future with threats like wars and global warming.

Single
On 4 March 2007 the single was released, placing 12th in the Swedish singles chart.

Track listing
Jag tror på människan
Jag tror på människan (instrumental)

Charts

References

Information at Svensk mediedatabas

2007 singles
Melodifestivalen songs of 2007
Swedish-language songs
Tommy Nilsson songs
Rock ballads
Sony BMG singles
2007 songs
Songs written by Tommy Nilsson
Songs written by Lasse Anderson